13025 Zürich, provisional designation , is a stony Phocaea asteroid from the inner regions of the asteroid belt, approximately 5 kilometers in diameter. It was discovered on 28 January 1989, by Swiss astronomer Paul Wild at Zimmerwald Observatory near Bern, Switzerland, and later named for the Swiss city of Zürich.

Orbit and classification 

The stony S-type asteroid is a member of the Phocaea family, a rather small group of asteroids with similar orbital characteristics, named after its largest member, 25 Phocaea. It orbits the Sun in the inner main-belt at a distance of 1.7–3.0 AU once every 3 years and 8 months (1,343 days). Its orbit has an eccentricity of 0.28 and an inclination of 24° with respect to the ecliptic. A first precovery was obtained at the Australian Siding Spring Observatory in 1975, extending the asteroid's observation arc by 14 years prior to its discovery.

Lightcurve 

In November 2006, American astronomer Brian Warner obtained a rotational lightcurve from photometric observations taken at his Palmer Divide Observatory in Colorado. The lightcurve showed a rotation period of  hours and a brightness variation of 0.24 in magnitude.

Diameter and albedo estimates 

According to the survey carried out by NASA's space-based Wide-field Infrared Survey Explorer with its subsequent NEOWISE mission, the asteroid measures 4.9 kilometers in diameter and its surface has a high albedo of 0.32, while the Collaborative Asteroid Lightcurve Link assumes an albedo of 0.23 and hence calculates a somewhat larger diameter of 5.3 kilometers with an absolute magnitude of 13.6.

Naming 

The minor planet is named after Zürich, Switzerland's largest city and economic center, located at the northwestern tip of Lake Zürich. It was founded by the Romans in the 1st century BC on the rivers Sihl and Limmat and was then called Turicum. The official naming citation was published by the Minor Planet Center on 1 November 2001.

References

External links 
  
 Lightcurve plot of 13025 Zurich, Palmer Divide Observatory, B. D. Warner (2006)
 Asteroid Lightcurve Database (LCDB), query form (info )
 Dictionary of Minor Planet Names, Google books
 Asteroids and comets rotation curves, CdR – Observatoire de Genève, Raoul Behrend
 Discovery Circumstances: Numbered Minor Planets (10001)-(15000) – Minor Planet Center
 
 

013025
Discoveries by Paul Wild (Swiss astronomer)
Named minor planets
19890128